is a Japanese voice actress and singer from Hyōgo Prefecture, Japan.

Biography

Filmography

Anime
2017
The Idolmaster Cinderella Girls Theater season 2 as Atsumi Munakata (ep 10)

2018
The Idolmaster Cinderella Girls Theater season 3 as Atsumi Munakata (ep 2)

2019
The Idolmaster Cinderella Girls Theater Climax Season as Atsumi Munakata (eps 4, 6)

2020
Idolish7: Second Beat! Audience C (ep 15)

Web anime
2016
Kobe Women's University History Department Promotion WEB Animation "Historical" as Shiki Kanotsuno

2020
The Idolmaster Cinderella Girls Theater: Extra Stage as Atsumi Munakata (ep 16)

Video games
2015
Sōsei no Liberion as Mary the First

2017
Tenkū no Craft Fleet as Rina, Soul
Tokyo Clanpool

2018
The Idolmaster Cinderella Girls as Atsumi Munakata
The Idolmaster Cinderella Girls Starlight Stage as Atsumi Munakata
Fight League as Ribon

2019
Valkyrie Connect as Soable

2020
Hiyoko Shachō no Machizukuri as Bonjiri
Mary Skelter: Nightmares as Elie

2021
Yotsume-shin -Saikai- as Shiro
Black Surgenight as Hiyō, Connor
Disgaea RPG as Tria

Drama CD
Tengoku ni Ichiban Chikai Kuni!? as Mami Kitayama
Subarashiki Jikan Ryokō!? as Nana Kuromori

Digital Comics
Kawai Sugiru Danshi ga Oie de Matteimasu as Reo's junior
Onidake no Yoru as Mitsu
Ashita Kara wa Seiso-san as Mei Hanae
Seishun Cinderella as Female Client A
Nina-san no Mahō Seikatsu as Nimuru
Saki-chan wa Inma no Ko (Gasshō) as Mika

Overseas dubbing

Animation
Duda & Dada as Oguri

Radio
Fujimoto Ayaka no Honki! AniLove (2018-2019)
Fujimoto Ayaka no Nyandeyanen (2019)
Fujimoto Ayaka to Nagano Yuki no Dream★Étude (2019–present)

Discography

Character Songs

Other

References

External links

Living people
Japanese women pop singers
Japanese video game actresses
Japanese voice actresses
Voice actresses from Hyōgo Prefecture
21st-century Japanese actresses
21st-century Japanese singers
21st-century Japanese women singers
Year of birth missing (living people)